Lanark North was a federal electoral district represented in the House of Commons of Canada from 1867 to 1917. It was located in the province of Ontario. It was created by the British North America Act of 1867 which divided the County of Lanark into two ridings: Lanark South and Lanark North.

In 1882, the North Riding of Lanark was defined to consist of the townships of Ramsay, Pakenham, Darling, Dalhousie, North Sherbrooke, Lavant, Fitzroy, Huntley and Lanark, the Town of Almonte, and the Village of Lanark.

In 1903, the village of Carleton Place was added to the riding, and the townships of Fitzroy and Huntley were excluded.

The electoral district was abolished in 1914 when it was merged into Lanark riding.

Electoral history

|}

|}

|}

|}

On Mr. Galbraith's death, 17 December 1879:

|}

|}

|}

|}

On Mr. Jamieson being appointed Junior County Judge, Wellington County, 8 December 1891:

|}

|}

|}

|}

|}

See also 
 List of Canadian federal electoral districts
 Past Canadian electoral districts

External links
 Parliamentary website

Former federal electoral districts of Ontario